Timothy James Michels (born August 7, 1962) is an American businessman who co-owns and co-manages Michels Corporation, a family-owned and operated construction company.

A member of the Republican Party, Michels was the party's unsuccessful nominee in the 2004 United States Senate election in Wisconsin and the 2022 Wisconsin gubernatorial election.

Early life and education
Born in Lomira, Wisconsin, Michels graduated from Lomira High School in 1980. He earned a Bachelor of Arts degree in political science from St. Norbert College in 1984, an MBA from the University of Chicago in 1997, and an MPA from the Illinois Institute of Technology the same year.

Career 
Michels served in the United States Army as an infantry officer for twelve years, earning the rank of major. He is a member of the American Legion and VFW.

He co-owns the Michels Corporation in Brownsville, Wisconsin.

Policy positions

Abortion 
When asked about contraception, Michels told the Milwaukee Journal Sentinel, “I am against abortion, I am not against contraception.” In September 2022, Michels said that he would support a state level abortion ban that included exceptions for pregnancies resulting from rape or incest.

Education 
Michels has proposed universal school choice, an expansion of the state's private school voucher program. Tony Evers vetoed a similar proposal that would have eliminated income caps for the voucher program. Michels has also been critical of the teaching of transgender topics in public K-12 schools and supports a greater emphasis on traditional educational topics.

Same-sex marriage 
In his 2004 U.S. Senate campaign, Michels said he believed that marriage should be between a man and woman. In his 2022 gubernatorial campaign Michels said that his personal position had not changed.

Political campaigns

Wisconsin State Senate
In 1998, Michels made a bid for the state Senate, and received 30 percent of the vote in the Republican primary, losing to incumbent senator Scott L. Fitzgerald.

U.S. Senate

In 2004, Michels defeated automobile dealer Russ Darrow Jr., state Senator Robert Welch, and attorney Robert Lorge in the Republican primary for the U.S. Senate.

Michels and his Democratic Party opponent, incumbent U.S. Senator Russ Feingold, sparred on such topics as Feingold's opposition to the Patriot Act, taxes, health care, and Feingold's opposition to the George W. Bush administration policies. The military veteran Michels strongly supported the Iraq War. Feingold pointed out Michel's political inexperience. Michels lost the general election to Russ Feingold, 55% to 44%.

In 2005, Princeton University conducted a study. They found that a quick look at a candidate’s photograph — a one-second exposure — created an initial impression that often lasted through the more deliberative process that helps a voter decide. The researchers showed study participants photos of Tim Michels and Russ Feingold, and were able to predict the outcome of the election based solely on facial appearances.

Wisconsin governor 

On April 22, 2022, Michels filed paperwork with the Wisconsin Elections Commission to begin his candidacy for governor of Wisconsin.

On July 11, 2022, Michels received the endorsement of former Governor Tommy Thompson, the state's longest-serving governor. Michels had also been endorsed by former President Donald Trump.

After announcing his campaign for Wisconsin governor, it was reported that Michels had spent the previous decade living part-time in Manhattan and Connecticut while maintaining primary residency in Wisconsin. During the campaign, his remarks on election integrity received criticism, and he said "Republicans will never lose another election in Wisconsin after I'm elected governor."

On November 8, 2022, Michels and his running mate Roger Roth lost the general election to Democrats Tony Evers and Sara Rodriguez.

Personal life 
Michels and his wife Barbara have three children. Michels and his wife have also split time living in Manhattan, Connecticut, and Wisconsin part-time since 2013. In 2020, Michels and his wife purchased a mansion in Greenwich for $17 million.

In March 2022, Tim and Barbara Michels donated $15 million for rare cancers research to the Medical College of Wisconsin. The gift was the largest ever to the MCW Cancer Center. The couple previously donated $3 million to the Weill Cornell Pediatric Brain and Spine Center, establishing the Michels Family Professorship endowment in Pediatric Neurological Surgery.

Electoral history

References

External links
Campaign website

1962 births
20th-century American businesspeople
21st-century American politicians
Businesspeople from Wisconsin
Candidates in the 2004 United States elections
Candidates in the 2022 United States elections
Illinois Institute of Technology alumni
Living people
Military personnel from Wisconsin
Politicians from Green Bay, Wisconsin
United States Army officers
University of Chicago alumni
Wisconsin Republicans